The Ribos Operation is the first serial of the 16th season of the British science fiction television series Doctor Who, which was first broadcast in four weekly parts on BBC1 from 2 to 23 September 1978. This serial introduces Mary Tamm as the companion Romana.

The serial is set on the primitive and superstitious planet Ribos. In the serial, the exiled Emperor of Levithia, Graff Vynda-K (Paul Seed), seeks a piece of the rare element jethrik on the planet. At the same time, the Fourth Doctor (Tom Baker) and his travelling companion Romana (Mary Tamm) look for the first segment of the powerful Key to Time, disguised as the same jethrik piece.

Plot
The White Guardian recruits the Fourth Doctor to collect the six hidden and disguised segments of the powerful Key to Time.  He assigns him an assistant Time Lady named Romanadvoratrelundar, whom the Doctor calls Romana.  He warns him that the Black Guardian also seeks these segments, but for an evil purpose.  The White Guardian provides them with a wand-like device, which can locate the pieces and remove their disguise.  When inserted into the TARDIS console, the locator first reveals a segment to be on Cyrrenhis Minima, but then moves to Ribos.

Ribos is an icy planet with late-medieval-type inhabitants who are unaware of alien cultures.  A human from Earth named Garron tries to sell Ribos to an exiled tyrant called the Graff Vynda-K.  The Graff is impressed by the planet's supposed quantity of jethrik, the rarest and most valued mineral in the galaxy. He believes the opportunity confirmed when he sees a piece of jethrik among the Ribos crown jewels.  This is all part of a ruse orchestrated by Garron; the jethrik was planted by Garron's assistant Unstoffe, who also was playing a native with an "honest face" who spins a yarn to the Graff about a nearby lost mine.  The locator points the Doctor and Romana to the same jethrik, which must be the disguised segment of the Key to Time.

The Graff Vynda-K provides a large sum of money as a deposit for the planet that is to be kept safely in the room with the crown jewels, watched by Ribos guards by day and a shrivenzale beast by night.  Later, Unstoffe distracts the shrivenzale, recovers their piece of jethrik, and takes the money from the safe.  The Graff learns of Garron's deception when he discovers a covert listening device in his room.  He imprisons Garron with his "accomplices", the Doctor and Romana, and starts the search for Unstoffe, who still has the money and the jethrik.  Unstoffe hides with Binro, a homeless outcast who believes that Ribos is a planet orbiting a star, and that there are other stars in the universe, which Unstoffe confirms to be true (because he was from Earth).  The Ribos guards summon a Seeker who locates Unstoffe's hideout.  Using the listening device in the Graff's room, Garron warns Unstoffe about the Graff.  Binro, thankful for Unstoffe's encouragement, leads him to the labyrinthine Catacombs under the city, where the natives bury their dead.

The Graff and his men enter the Catacombs without the guards, who fear the place, and the Seeker warns that if they enter, "All but one are doomed to die." K9 helps the Doctor, Romana, and Garron escape and go to the Catacombs. The guards destroy the entrance to the Catacombs causing the ceiling to collapse on the Graff's men.  Having recovered the money and the jethrik, the Graff gives his last surviving guard an explosive to kill himself with. The guard, actually the Doctor in disguise, swaps the explosive for the jethrik. The Graff walks off into the maze yelling like a madman as the sounds of one of his previous battles resound around him, before exploding.

After leaving the Catacombs, the Doctor, Romana, and K9 dematerialise in the TARDIS.  Garron and Unstoffe claim the Graff's deserted ship, full of years of plunder, while the Doctor and Romana transform the jethrik into the first piece of the Key to Time.

Production
Working titles for this story include Operation and The Ribos File. The opening scene, with the White Guardian, was actually written by Anthony Read and Graham Williams, and not Robert Holmes.

The serial was filmed entirely in studio in April 1978.

From this story until The Horns of Nimon (1979–80), Baker wears an extra-long scarf, which is the original scarf and the stunt scarf sewn together.

Cast notes
Elisabeth Sladen, who as Sarah Jane Smith was last seen in The Hand of Fear (1976), was approached to return to the series as a replacement for Leela (who had left in The Invasion of Time). When Sladen declined the offer, Romana was created.

Prentis Hancock had appeared in Spearhead from Space (1970), Planet of the Daleks (1973), and Planet of Evil (1975).

Broadcast and reception

Paul Cornell, Martin Day, and Keith Topping gave the serial a favourable review in The Discontinuity Guide (1995), calling it "a lovely story". In The Television Companion (1998), David J. Howe and Stephen James Walker praised the "cracking set of scripts" and production values. They described Binro as "perhaps the most fascinating and well written of all the characters in the main part of the story set on Ribos" and also praised Mary Tamm's debut as Romana, despite noting that "she goes through the whole of The Ribos Operation giving the impression that she has got an unpleasant smell under her nose". In 2010, Patrick Mulkern of Radio Times gave the story a positive review, in particular towards the acting and production, but stated that he did not like Binro. The A.V. Club reviewer Christopher Bahn called The Ribos Operation one of Robert Holmes' better stories, writing that it was "a fun, tightly constructed caper". DVD Talk's Justin Felix gave the story three and a half out of five stars, writing that it was an "effective beginning" to the season despite being a "simple" story. While he praised Romana's character, he felt that Tamm's performance was "a bit flat".

Commercial releases

In print

Ian Marter's novelisation was published by Target Books in December 1979. Curiously, it features the Doctor opening the TARDIS doors by means of an old brass knob.

In audio
It was released on CD in March 2011. John Leeson, who provided the voice of K9 in the original 1978 TV serial, reads Ian Marter's complete and unabridged novelisation of this story.

Home media
It was released on VHS on 3 April 1995. Along with the rest of season sixteen, it was released in North America as part of the Key to Time box set, as well as being marketed separately. It was released in a restored limited edition on region 2 DVD on 24 September 2007. The DVD box set was reissued in November 2009. It was also released as part of the Doctor Who DVD Files in Issue 107 on 6 February 2013.

References

External links

Target novelisation

Doctor Who serials novelised by Ian Marter
Fourth Doctor serials
1978 British television episodes